Robert Phillip Conn (born September 3, 1968) is a Canadian former professional ice hockey right wing. He played 30 games in the National Hockey League for the Chicago Blackhawks and Buffalo Sabres between 1992 and 1996. The rest of his career, which lasted from 1991 to 1997, was mainly spent in the minor leagues.

Playing career
Conn was born in Calgary, Alberta. As a youth, he played in the 1981 Quebec International Pee-Wee Hockey Tournament with a minor ice hockey team from Calgary. He played in the National Hockey League with the Chicago Blackhawks and Buffalo Sabres. In his NHL career, Conn appeared in thirty games. He scored two goals and added five assists. In 1995, he won the Calder Cup with the Albany River Rats, and again 1996 with the Rochester Americans.

Career statistics

Regular season and playoffs

References

External links

1968 births
Living people
Alaska Anchorage Seawolves men's ice hockey players
Albany River Rats players
Buffalo Sabres players
Calgary Canucks players
Canadian ice hockey right wingers
Chicago Blackhawks players
Indianapolis Ice players
Rochester Americans players
Ice hockey people from Calgary
Undrafted National Hockey League players